First Presbyterian Church is a historic church at 260 S. Pine Street in Spalding, Nebraska.  It has also been known as St. Andrew Community Church.

Extending out from a 1904 church building, the current building was designed in  Tudor Revival style by architects Grabe and Helleberg and was built in 1921.

It was added to the National Register in 2004.

References

External links 
More photos of the St. Andrew Community Church at Wikimedia Commons

Presbyterian churches in Nebraska
Churches on the National Register of Historic Places in Nebraska
Tudor Revival architecture in Nebraska
Churches completed in 1904
Churches in Greeley County, Nebraska
National Register of Historic Places in Greeley County, Nebraska
1904 establishments in Nebraska